Franck Roberts Havenner (September 20, 1882  – July 24, 1967) was a six-term United States representative from California's 4th congressional district in the mid-20th century.

Biography
Havenner was born in Sherwood, Maryland, on September 20, 1882.  He attended Columbian College (now George Washington University) and Stanford University, afterwards working as a journalist in San Francisco.

Originally a Republican, served on the San Francisco Board of Supervisors from 1926 to 1936.  In 1935, he ran for president of the Board of Supervisors and won.  As supervisor he fought unsuccessfully to fulfill the Raker Act of 1913 and bring public power to the City and County of San Francisco.

Congress 

Havenner was elected to the United States House of Representatives in the 1936 election with the nominations of both the California Progressive Party and Democratic parties against Republican nominee Florence Prag Kahn. Havenner served two terms in Congress. In 1939 he registered as a Democrat, and ran unsuccessfully for mayor against Angelo Joseph Rossi.

He was defeated for reelection to Congress in 1940, and was a member of the California Railroad Commission from 1941 to 1944.  He won election to Congress in 1944, served from 1945 to 1953, and became a member of the House Armed Services Committee.  In 1952 he was defeated for reelection by Republican William S. Mailliard.  After leaving Congress he worked for the American Federation of Labor.

Death 
Havenner died in San Francisco on July 24, 1967, and was buried at Cypress Lawn Memorial Park in Colma, California.

References

External links
 

1882 births
1967 deaths
Members of the United States House of Representatives from California
People from Talbot County, Maryland
California Progressives (1924)
San Francisco Board of Supervisors members
California Republicans
Progressive Party (1924) members of the United States House of Representatives
Columbian College of Arts and Sciences alumni
20th-century American politicians
Burials at Cypress Lawn Memorial Park
Democratic Party members of the United States House of Representatives from California